Frank J. Cosgrove (October 22, 1914 – October 19, 1980) was an American farmer, businessman, and politician.

Born in Viola, Wisconsin, Cosgrove was a farmer and then in 1950 was an insurance agent. He was president of the Richland Center Chamber of Commerce. Cosgrove served as town supervisor between 1940 and 1942 and then was supervisor of the Viola Soil Conservation District. In 1959, Cosgrove served in the Wisconsin State Assembly and was a Democrat. In 1961, President John F. Kennedy appointed Cosgrove postmaster of Richland Center, Wisconsin serving until his retirement in 1977. At the time of his death, Cosgrove served on the Richland Center Water Utility Commission.

Notes

1914 births
1980 deaths
People from Viola, Wisconsin
Businesspeople from Wisconsin
Farmers from Wisconsin
Wisconsin city council members
Wisconsin postmasters
20th-century American businesspeople
20th-century American politicians
Democratic Party members of the Wisconsin State Assembly